Oaklawn-Sunview is an unincorporated community in Sedgwick County, Kansas, United States.  As of the 2020 census, the population of this community was 2,880.  It is located on the south side of Wichita along the west side of K-15 (Southeast Blvd) and 47th Street South intersection.

Geography
Oaklawn-Sunview is located at  (37.608463, -97.296045).

Demographics

For statistical purposes, the United States Census Bureau has defined Oaklawn-Sunview as a census-designated place (CDP).

2000
At the 2000 census, there were 3,135 people, 1,056 households and 785 families residing in the community. The racial makeup of the community was 62.7% White, 8.9% African American, 2.4% Native American, 15.5% Asian, <0.1% Pacific Islander, 5.4% from other races, and 5.1% from two or more races. Hispanic or Latino of any race were 11.4% of the population.

There were 1,056 households, of which 44.1% had children under the age of 18 living with them, 49.1% were married couples living together, 17.0% had a female householder with no husband present, and 25.6% were non-families. 20.3% of all households were made up of individuals, and 4.9% had someone living alone who was 65 years of age or older. The average household size was 2.97 and the average family size was 3.47.

35.1% of the population were under the age of 18, 10.9% from 18 to 24, 30.6% from 25 to 44, 16.7% from 45 to 64, and 6.7% who were 65 years of age or older. The median age was 27 years. For every 100 females, there were 102.5 males. For every 100 females age 18 and over, there were 100.2 males.

The median household income was $34,292 and the median family income was $35,978. Males had a median income of $30,956 and females $20,172. The per capita income was $12,564. About 16.2% of families and 18.3% of the population were below the poverty line, including 20.8% of those under age 18 and 22.2% of those age 65 or over.

Education
The community is served by Derby USD 260 public school district.

References

Further reading

External links
 Wichita city map, KSDOT
 Sedgwick County maps: Current, Historic, KDOT

Census-designated places in Sedgwick County, Kansas
Census-designated places in Kansas
Wichita, KS Metropolitan Statistical Area
Kansas populated places on the Arkansas River